Paul McLaughlin (born 29 December 1969) is a British businessman. From August 2015 to October 2017, he was chief executive of the Building Engineering Services Association, a trade association within the construction sector.

Early life 
McLaughlin, the son of Joseph and Catherine McLaughlin and the eldest of their four children, grew up in Glasgow where he attended the University of Glasgow. He graduated in Engineering in 1991 and moved to Slough to join the Mars Confectionery graduate training programme.

Career 
Following completion of the Mars Confectionery graduate training scheme, McLaughlin joined The Coca-Cola Company in 2005, as operations controller at the Durham Plant, responsible for operations, engineering and warehouse functions.

He held various positions in quality and innovations departments, before becoming the commercialisation director for north-west Europe.

He was appointed as CEO of Scotland Food & Drink in October 2007.

In December 2009, McLaughlin launched the first joined-up strategy for the entire food and drink sector in Scotland, including agriculture, fishing and aquaculture.

In May 2011, McLaughlin announced his departure from Scotland Food & Drink to join Albert Bartlett Ltd as Managing Director of Scotty Brand Ltd, a commercial organisation promoting Scottish in season produce.

He became chief executive of the Building Engineering Services Association in August 2015, leaving the role in October 2017 following a cycling accident.

References

External links 
 scotlandfoodanddrink.org
 Scotty Brand
 BESA

1969 births
Living people
Scottish chief executives
Alumni of the University of Glasgow
People educated at Holyrood Secondary School
Businesspeople from Glasgow
20th-century Scottish businesspeople
21st-century Scottish businesspeople